"United We Stand" is a song written by Tony Hiller and Peter Simons (writer's pseudonym for group member Johnny Goodison). It was first released in 1970 by the Brotherhood of Man (in their original, pre-Eurovision line-up), becoming the band's first hit, peaking at #13 in the U.S., #9 in Canada, and #10 in the U.K.  The song spent 15 weeks on the charts, and is ranked as the 64th biggest U.S. hit of 1970. It also reached #8 in Australia.

Background
Reg Dwight, who would later become famous as Elton John, was an office boy at Mills Music, a Denmark Street music publishing house where Hiller worked. Hiller knew he could sing and had him record the original demo for "United We Stand."

Billboard gave the song a favourable review on 14 March 1970 calling it a "strong production" and (correctly) predicting it would become a top 20 hit on the Billboard Hot 100.
The song was later included on an album of the same name and was followed by another hit "Where are You Going to My Love".

Chart history

Weekly charts

Year-end charts

Cover versions
It has been recorded by over 100 different artists, including:
 A sound-alike cover appeared on the 1970 album Top of the Pops, Volume 10. 
 Edison Lighthouse on their 1971 album, Already.
 Elton John on his 1994 LP, Reg Dwight's Piano Goes Pop. It is sung as a duet with Kay Garner.
 Sonny and Cher on their 1971 album All I Ever Need Is You.
 Belgian singer Liliane Saint-Pierre covered the song in French as Nous resterons unis (We will remain united).
 German singer Mary Roos covered the song in her language as In Gedanken (In thought).
 In Italy, in the 1972, the pop duo  reached the local top ten chart covering the song in Italian as Voglio stare con te (I want to be with you).
 Irish Popstars winners Six also recorded a version which appeared on their album in 2002.  It was also used as the B-side of their biggest hit single, "There's a Whole Lot of Loving".
 Phish closed out their three-night stand at Dick's Sporting Goods Park in Commerce City, Colorado, on 6 September 2015, to end a 8-song encore with the song, playing to 26,000 people in attendance and a live stream on the Internet. The encore spelled out "THANK YOU".
Last song played during the credits of the 2022 finale of the HBO Max miniseries Station Eleven.
On The Muppet Show, The Muppets covered the song with Lola Falana in her episode.
 American Juniors

Popular culture
In 1977, it was used as the closing theme song of the short-lived Brady Bunch Hour. 
Forty years after the original 1970 hit it was popularised again by becoming a patriotic and spiritual anthem for many during the post 9/11 recovery. 
It has also been used as a football chant and by gay rights groups. Taken literally, the song's lyrics convey two lovers who tell each other that no matter what hardships come their way, they will always be together. In general terms, it relates a message of strength in unity.

References

External links
 Lyrics of this song
 

1970 singles
Brotherhood of Man songs
The Muppets songs
Glen Campbell songs
Tony Burrows songs
Songs written by Tony Hiller
Deram Records singles
1970 songs